The 2009–10 season was the 53rd season in RK Zamet’s history. It is their 2nd successive season in the Dukat Premier League, and 33rd successive top tier season.

First team squad

Goalkeeper
 1  Dino Slavić
 12  Marin Ðurica
 16  Valter Matošević

Wingers
RW
 6  Dario Černeka
LW
 2  Damir Vučko
 4  Mateo Hrvatin

Line players
 7  Milan Uzelac (captain)
 14  Marin Zubčić
 15  Krešimir Kozina

Back players
LB
 5  Luka Tandara
 17  Nikola Babić
CB
 3  Marin Sakić
 9  Bruno Kozina
 18  Matija Golik
RB
 11  Marin Kružić
 13  Luka Kovacević
 19  Luka Bracanovic

Source: rukometstat.com

Source: rijekadanas.com

Technical staff
  President: Zlatko Kolić
  Vice-president: Željko Jovanović
  Sports director: Aleksandar Cupić
  Head Coach: Damir Čavlović
  Assistant Coach: Marin Mišković
  Goalkeeper Coach: Valter Matošević
  Fitness Coach: Branimir Maričević
  Tehniko: Williams Černeka

Competitions

Overall

Dukat Premier League

League table

Source: SportNet.hr

Matches

Croatian Cup

West Region Cup – Qualifiers

Matches

Friendlies

Transfers

In

Out

Sources
HRS
Sport.net.hr

RK Zamet seasons
Handball in Croatia